Soft tennis at the 2018 Asian Games was held at the JSC Tennis Court, Palembang, Indonesia. It was held from 28 August to 1 September 2018.

Soft tennis had team and singles events for men and women, as well as a mixed doubles competition.

Schedule

Medalists

Medal table

Participating nations
A total of 113 athletes from 14 nations competed in soft tennis at the 2018 Asian Games:

References

External links
Soft tennis at the 2018 Asian Games
Official Result Book – Soft Tennis

 
2018
2018 Asian Games events
Asian Games 2018
Asian Games tournament